Joseph A. Salazar (born 1971/72) is a former Democratic member of the Colorado House of Representatives, serving from 2013 to early 2019. Salazar previously worked as an attorney with Smith, Shelton, Ragona and Salazar, LLC. He focused on employment law, civil rights, and constitutional law. Currently, he is the director of Colorado Rising, an anti-fracking pressure group.

Salazar ran for Colorado Attorney General in the 2018 election but lost in the primary to fellow Democrat Phil Weiser.

In January 2021, Salazar expressed interest in challenging incumbent Democratic senator Michael Bennet in the Democratic primary for the 2022 U.S. Senate election in Colorado.

State Senate candidacy
In November 2021, Salazar filed papers to run for Colorado's 24th Senate district. At the time of Salazar's announcement, the district was represented by Faith Winter, but her residence will be in Senate District 25 due to redistricting, leaving the new district open. The district will include Thornton and Federal Heights and parts of unincorporated Adams County to the northeast of these two municipalities. Salazar did not appear on the Democratic primary ballot.

References

External links
 
Legislative website

Living people
Democratic Party members of the Colorado House of Representatives
Native American state legislators
People from Thornton, Colorado
21st-century American politicians
Year of birth missing (living people)